Allamuchy Mountain is a mountain in Sussex and Warren Counties, New Jersey. The mountain also covers portions of Allamuchy Township in Warren County and Green Township in Sussex County. It overlooks the Musconetcong River to the southeast, and forms part of the divide between that river and the Pequest to the northwest. It is part of the New York–New Jersey Highlands of the Reading Prong.

Allamuchy Mountain State Park covers portions of the mountain.

History
An 1834 description read,

References 

Mountains of Sussex County, New Jersey
Mountains of Warren County, New Jersey
Mountains of New Jersey